Again is the debut album from French musician Colder, released by Output Recordings on 7 July 2003. The album was produced in Paris, France, and features the singles "Crazy Love" and "Shiny Star". The album was also released as a special edition with a bonus DVD. The album is currently out of print.

Track listing

Personnel
Marc Nguyen Tan – music, vocals, visual material (still and animated)
Norscq – premastering

Singles
 "Shiny Star" (28 April 2003)
7" vinyl:
 "Shiny Star"
 "The Slow Descent"
 "Crazy Love" (10 November 2003)
CD:
 "Crazy Love" (Original Mix)
 "Crazy Love" (Mainstream Ensemble's Crazy Love)
 "Crazy Love" (Luke Innes' Crazy Love)
 "Crazy Love" (Norscq's Crazy Love)
12" vinyl:
 "Crazy Love" (Original Mix)
 "Crazy Love" (Luke Innes' Crazy Love)
 "Crazy Love" (Rework's Crazy Love)

References

2003 debut albums
Colder (musician) albums